"Inside a Dream" is a pop song by Go Go's guitarist Jane Wiedlin. It was the second single from her album Fur. Its predecessor "Rush Hour" fared better commercially. The track "Song of the Factory", also from Fur, was the B-side to "Inside a Dream", while remixed versions by Mark S. Berry augmented the 12" and CD formats. The music video for the song featured Wiedlin in dream-like scenic landscapes in the mountains and on a coast.

Interpretation
Although the song has an upbeat major chord progression, the song's lyrics have a yearning, somewhat misanthropic theme. Wiedlin, in the chorus, sings how she wants to "live in a dream" in order to "find a world worth living for".

Chart positions

References

1988 singles
Jane Wiedlin songs
Songs written by Jane Wiedlin
Songs written by Gardner Cole
Song recordings produced by Stephen Hague
1988 songs
Manhattan Records singles